Frances M. Bowes  (1865 – January 21, 1895) was an American professional baseball player for one season.  He appeared in 61 games for the 1890 Brooklyn Gladiators of the American Association. Bowes' father, Patrick, was police officer in the Greenpoint area of Brooklyn. After his baseball career, he was working for Edward C. Smith's box factory on Oakland Street. On January 21, 1895 he confronted his factory manager over his pay. William Snow, his manager, told him to talk to the owner but Bowes began assaulting Snow. Bowes continued though Snow warned him that he was armed. When Bowes did not comply, Snow shot him three times through the heart, killing him. Bowes is interred at Calvary Cemetery in Woodside, Queens, New York.

References

External links

1865 births
1895 deaths
Major League Baseball third basemen
Major League Baseball catchers
Major League Baseball outfielders
19th-century baseball players
Brooklyn Gladiators players
Burials at Calvary Cemetery (Queens)
Baseball players from New York (state)
Deaths by firearm in Brooklyn